The CGR class C1 and C1a were steam locomotives of the Garratt type built by Beyer, Peacock & Company, England for the Ceylon Government Railways (CGR), now Sri Lanka Railways. The Class C1 prototype was built in 1928 and was followed by eight Class C1a locomotives in 1946. The C1a class was converted to oil firing between 1950 and 1954.

CGR numbers
 C1, 241 (total 1)
 C1A, 343-50 (total 8)

Dimensions
Dimensions are shown in the table (right).  Particulars of the boilers are not known but it is likely that the C1a had a significantly bigger boiler than the C1.  The evidence for this is that the C1a was  tons heavier than the C1, although it carried  less fuel and about  less water.

See also
 Locomotives of Sri Lanka Railways
 CGR class H1

References

C1 and C1a
Garratt locomotives
2-6-2+2-6-2 locomotives
Beyer, Peacock locomotives
Railway locomotives introduced in 1928
5 ft 6 in gauge locomotives